Carlos Abarca González (born 22 May 1900, date of death unknown) was a Chilean boxer who competed in the 1924 Summer Olympics. In the 1924 Olympic tournament Abarca was eliminated in the quarter-finals of the featherweight class after losing his fight to the eventual gold medalist Jackie Fields of the United States.

1924 Olympic results
Below are the results of Carlos Abarca, a Chilean featherweight boxer who competed at the 1924 Paris Olympics:

 Round of 32: defeated Gustaf Bergman (Sweden) by decision
 Round of 16: defeated Emilio Bautista (Spain) by decision
 Quarterfinal: lost to Jackie Fields (United States) by decision

References

External links

Carlos Abarca's profile at Sports Reference.com

1900 births
Featherweight boxers
Olympic boxers of Chile
Boxers at the 1924 Summer Olympics
Year of death missing
Chilean male boxers
20th-century Chilean people